The 2012–13 Saint Peter's Peacocks men's basketball team represented Saint Peter's University during the 2012–13 NCAA Division I men's basketball season. The Peacocks, led by seventh year head coach John Dunne, played their home games at the Yanitelli Center and were members of the Metro Atlantic Athletic Conference. They finished the season 9–21, 3–15 in MAAC play to finish in last place. They lost in the first round of the MAAC tournament to Fairfield.

Roster

Schedule

|-
!colspan=9| Regular season

|-
!colspan=9| 2013 MAAC men's basketball tournament

References

Saint Peter's Peacocks men's basketball seasons
Saint Peter's
Saint Peter's Peacocks basketball
Saint Peter's Peacocks basketball